Chaqa Siah (also Romanized as Chaqā Sīāh, Chaqā Seyāh, and Cheqā Sīāh; also known as Chigha-yi-Siah and Chvoqā Sīāh) is a village in Nahr-e Mian Rural District, Zalian District, Shazand County, Markazi Province, Iran. At the 2006 census, its population was 343, in 100 families.

References 

Populated places in Shazand County